J Goodacre & Co Ltd was a haulage company and coal merchant based in Hathern, Leicestershire. It was founded before the Second World War and went bankrupt in the early 2000s. It had small contracts with coal miners and big contracts with companies such as British Gypsum. J Goodacre & Co Ltd was based on Wide Street in Hathern. It was a registered company and the Operator Licence Number OF1005768. It was licensed to operate up to 22 vehicles.

References

Goodacre, J